Gobernador Gregores is a town in Santa Cruz Province, Argentina, formerly known as Cañadón León. Ramón Outerello, one of the leaders of the massive strike known as Patagonia rebelde was executed there by a firing squad of the Argentine Army in November 1921.

Climate
Gobernador Gregores has a cool arid climate (BWk).

References

Notes

Populated places in Santa Cruz Province, Argentina
Populated places established in 1871
1871 establishments in Argentina
Cities in Argentina
Argentina
Santa Cruz Province, Argentina